Kirner's deformity, also known as dystelephangy, is an uncommon genetic hand malformation which is characterized by a radial and volar curvature of the distal phalange of the fifth (pinky) finger. It is merely cosmetic and isn't painful/doesn't affect hand function.

Signs and symptoms 

This anomaly is characterized by the painless curvature and "bulbing" of the distal end of the little finger The time of onset varies among people, but the two most common ages of onset are birth (already present since birth) and adolescence (developing during puberty), although there can be cases where one is already born with a Kirner's deformity that worsens as one grows older (progressive).

Rarely, multiple fingers (which may or may not include the little finger) might be affected with Kirner's deformity, this is known as polytopic dystelephalangy, and cases like this typically have a strong genetic link.

Other isolated congenital deformities of the hand can occur alongside this deformity, one such instance is the family described by Erduran et al. which presented both camptodactyly and Kirner's deformity.

Radiological findings 

The following list comprises the radiological findings associated with Kirner's deformity that have been described in medical literature:

Diaphyseal shortening
Diaphyseal curvature
Epiphyseal curvature
Sclerosing of the diaphyses
Agenesis of the little finger's flexor digitorum superficialis tendon.
Abnormal cartilage placement of the diaphyses and the flexor tendon
Radiolucent nidus in the little finger's distal tuft.
L-shaped physis

Causes 

This deformity is caused by a widening of the epiphyseal plate of the fifth finger's distal phalange. Another proposed cause involves the abnormal insertion of the flexor digitorum profundus in the volar area of the fifth finger's distal phalange. It is thought to be an autosomal dominant trait with reduced penetrance.

Diagnosis 

This condition can be diagnosed by physical examination and radiographic imaging, including X-rays, magnetic resonance imaging, etc.

Differential diagnosis 

This condition can be confused with other entities (congenital and acquired) of the hand, these include:

Camptodactyly
Clinodactyly
Mallet finger
Fracture
Brachydactyly type A3 (also known as brachymesophalangy type V)

Epidemiology 

This hand difference is estimated to be present in 0.15%-0.25% of the world population.(1 out of every 400-600 people)

It is more common in women than in men; physical examination performed on people from a selected region in southern England by David and Burwood et al. found 18 individuals from 9 families with Kirner's deformity. Of these 18 individuals, 6 were men and 12 were women.

It has a higher incidence rate among the Japanese.

Treatment 

A handful of treatment methods resulting in successful improvement of Kirner's deformity have been described, these include:

Bonola's technique
Serial splinting
Corrective osteotomy
Physeal obliteration
Distance lengthening

Associations 

The following subsections comprise Kirner deformity's non-syndromic and syndromic associations:

Non-syndromic 

Myositis ossificans
High-arched foot
Genu valgus
Congenital heart defect

Syndromic 

These are the syndromes associated with this malformation

Turner syndrome
Silver syndrome
Cornelia de Lange syndrome
Down syndrome

Etimology 
This condition is considered to be a type of isolated brachydactyly.

A.R. Thomas et al. described it as a "dystrophy of the fifth finger".

History 

This difference was first discovered in 1927 by Kirner et al., when he described a 13-year-old girl with the characteristic radial and volar curvature of the fifth finger's distal phalanx bone.

See also 

Brachydactyly type D
Syndactyly
Minor physical anomalies

References 

Congenital disorders of musculoskeletal system